The 1998 United States Senate election in Nevada was held on November 3, 1998. Incumbent Democratic Senator Harry Reid won re-election to a third term by a margin of less than 0.1% and 401 votes, making this the closest race of the 1998 Senate election cycle.

Republican primary

Candidates
John Ensign, U.S. Representative
Ralph W. Stephens

Results

General election

Candidates
Michael Cloud (L)
John Ensign (R), U.S. Representative
Harry Reid (D), incumbent U.S. Senator
Michael Williams (NL)

Campaign
Early in the campaign, Reid held a double-digit lead over Ensign in most polls.  After a fierce battle of attack ads on television by both candidates, Ensign pulled into a dead heat with Reid.  This reversal of fortune was attributed to several factors.  More than 125,000 new residents had arrived in Nevada since 1992, many of them settling in Ensign's suburban Clark County congressional district.  As such, many of them were more familiar with Ensign than with Reid, whose previous Republican opponents had hailed from other regions of the state.  Republican consultant John Maddox observed that Ensign's greater familiarity to the Las Vegas metropolitan region gave him an advantage, adding that "he has won votes from Democrats who have never voted for Reid."  In contrast, Reid was believed to hold an advantage with longtime Nevada residents, particularly those in slower-growing regions of the state.  In addition, the number of registered Republicans in Nevada had dramatically increased as well; in 1992, Democrats had held an advantage of approximately 40,000 registered voters, but by 1998 Republicans outnumbered Democrats by 4,000.  John Ralston, a political analyst in Las Vegas, claimed that Reid was also hurt by declining voter enthusiasm in the wake of the Monica Lewinsky scandal.  Reid had been one of the first senators to express dissatisfaction with President Clinton over the scandal, describing the president's behavior as "immoral."

During the campaign, Reid cited his efforts to block the storage of nuclear waste at the Yucca Mountain repository, while also using the issue to attack Ensign.  In one campaign speech, Reid claimed, "You send Ensign to the Senate, you send nuclear waste to Nevada."  Ensign responded to the attacks by pointing out his own position against the depository and indicated he would work with Richard Bryan, the state's other senator, to stop it.  "Bryan's a Democrat who works with Republicans," he said, "and I'm a Republican who works with Democrats."  The Reid campaign also attacked Ensign as an "extremist" who would weaken Social Security and referred to environmentalists as "socialists."  Ensign, meanwhile accused Reid of supporting tax increases in Washington even as he claimed to support lower taxes at home.

Results
On November 3, 1998, Reid won by 401 votes in an exceptionally close election—even closer than South Dakota in 2002, when incumbent Senator Tim Johnson defeated Congressman John Thune by 524 votes. Ensign did not contest the results, and was elected to Nevada's other Senate seat in 2000 succeeded the retiring Richard Bryan and served with Reid until 2011, much like Thune who was elected to South Dakota's other Senate seat in 2004.

County breakdown

See also 
 1998 United States Senate elections

References

1998
Nevada
1998 Nevada elections